"One Flew Over the Cuckoo Clock" is an episode of the BBC sitcom, The Green Green Grass. It was first screened on 25 December 2005, as the 2005 Christmas Special.

Synopsis

After receiving an invitation to the Agricultural Ball in Somerset, Boycie and Marlene decide to attend and take Bryan as their driver. Boycie begins to worry that the Driscoll Brothers might be at the ball. Upon arriving they soon begin to settle in, until they meet two men who run a polo club who tell Boycie he could become a partner for a few million pounds and could even be knighted 'Sir Aubrey'.

The snob in Boycie comes rushing to the top and he agrees to meet them in Switzerland for a Christmas holiday, but unfortunately, on Christmas Eve, Boycie and Marlene are snowed in. Consequently, they are forced to spend Christmas with Mrs Cakeworthy, Bryan, Jed and Llewellyn. The snow does not lift quickly, so the realisation that they have missed their flight annoys Boycie.

Meanwhile, Elgin has gone into hospital to have his appendix removed; therefore, Llewellyn is filling in as farm manager for him. Also, Boycie and Marlene sit down to watch a festive edition of Crimewatch, only to find that the two men who had invited Boycie abroad were con men, and that the Driscoll Brothers had followed them to Switzerland. They had recognised Boycie's picture in a country magazine that just happened to mention where they would be this Christmas. So Boycie insists that God looked after him and made it snow on purpose. Therefore, the Boyces are safe and sound, for now, and can continue to celebrate a Christmas Driscoll-free.

Episode cast

Production, broadcast and reception

Writing
This episode was written by John Sullivan, writer of Only Fools and Horses. The whole of the first series was written entirely by John Sullivan. He was asked by the BBC mid-way through the first series being aired to write an hour-long episode for Christmas Day.

Broadcast
During its original airing, the episode had a viewing audience of 4.59 million, in the 8pm timeslot it was shown. This is the same audiences that sitcoms such as My Family attract.

This episode has since been re-run on BBC1, BBC HD and GOLD. The show received one of the highest ratings of the week making it into the top thirty.

DVD release
The UK DVD release was released on 23 October 2006. The release includes the 2005 Christmas Special, a short special entitled 'Grass Roots' and a short documentary on 'Rocky'.

Conception
The episode was commissioned part way through the original broadcast of the first series. John Sullivan was asked to produce an hour-long special that would be aired on Christmas Day. The special was written, filmed and aired at 8pm on Christmas Day. The episode was designed for the Driscoll Brothers to make a return and for Boycie is narrowly miss them.

Filming
The episode was filmed late 2005 and featured a guest appearance for Only Fools and Horses regular, Sid as played by Roy Heather. The set of The Nag's Head was used for the short cameo appearance. Also, Roy Marsden and Christopher Ryan appeared as their irregular Only Fools and Horses characters Danny and Tony Driscoll. This marked the Driscoll Brothers first appearance in the show. This episode was also the last episode as of 2009, to feature a regular Only Fools character.

The episode also featured a large cast of nineteen credited actors/actresses. This is the largest cast that the series has seen so far.

Locations
This episode was filmed at Pinewood Studios, and on location in Shropshire. The episode featured the use of Only Fools and Horses set, The Nag's Head, but only briefly. The only character to be seen in this scene was Roy Heather's Sid. The second series onwards was filmed at Teddington Studios.

References

British TV Comedy Guide for The Green Green Grass
BARB viewing figures

2005 British television episodes
The Green Green Grass episodes